The Coeur d'Alene Subdivision is a railway line running about  from Coeur d'Alene, ID to Hauser Junction near Hauser, ID.  It is operated by BNSF Railway.

The territory is track warrant controlled.

BNSF has since removed the line from Coeur d'Alene to Hutter, ID.  Currently the subdivision is currently only  but the rail line is still timetabled to Coeur d'Alene

References

External links
BNSF Subdivisions

BNSF Railway lines
Rail infrastructure in Idaho